John Watts may refer to:

Politics
John Watts (1715–1789), Member of the New York General Assembly
John Watts (New York politician) (1749–1836), U.S. Representative from New York
Statue of John Watts, an 1893 outdoor bronze sculpture
John Watts (Australian politician) (1821–1902), Queensland politician
John Watts (British politician) (1947–2016), British MP from Slough
John Watts (Stoke politician) (1864–1951), British political activist and mine rescue hero
John Watts (Grenadian politician) (1921/22-2015), Grenada MP
John C. Watts (1902–1971), U.S. Representative from Kentucky
John Sebrie Watts (1816–1876), U.S. House Delegate from New Mexico Territory

Sports
John Watts (athlete) (born 1939), British Olympic athlete
John Watts (jockey) (1860–1902), British jockey
Johnny Watts (English footballer) (1931–2006), English football player for Birmingham City F.C.
Johnny Watts (Australian footballer) (1883–1952), Australian rules footballer
John K. Watts (1937–2017), Australian sportsman and broadcaster
John Watts (judoka) (born 1944), British judoka

Military
John Watts (military architect) (1786–1873), British military officer and colonial architect in New South Wales
John Watts de Peyster (1821–1907), author on the art of war, philanthropist; early Adjutant General of the New York National Guard
John Watts de Peyster Jr. (1841–1873), Union Army officer during the American Civil War
John Watts (British Army officer) (1930–2003), British general

Others
John Watts (merchant) (died 1616), English merchant and shipowner
John Watts (Royal Navy officer) (1755–1801), midshipman on James Cook's third voyage to the Pacific
John Watts (Cherokee chief) (died 1802), also known as "Young Tassel"
John Watts (sailor) (c. 1778–1823), U.S. merchant captain from Virginia
John Watts (reformer) (1818–1887), English educational and social reformer
John Watts (composer) (1929–1982), American composer
John Watts (singer) (born 1954), British singer/guitarist and member of Fischer-Z
John Watts (historian), late medieval historian
John D. W. Watts, Baptist theologian and Old Testament scholar
John W.H. Watts, curator and architect

See also
Jon Watts (born 1981), American filmmaker
Jack Watts (disambiguation)
John Watt (disambiguation)